Henry Bowen (December 26, 1841 – April 29, 1915) was a Virginia lawyer, soldier and politician from Tazewell County, Virginia. After raising a unit which became the 22nd Virginia Cavalry, he fought for the Confederate States of America during the American Civil War, after which Bowen served in the Virginia House of Delegates, as well as the U.S. House of Representatives, first as a Readjuster, then as a Republican.

Family and early life 
Born at "Maiden Spring," near Tazewell, Tazewell County, Virginia, Bowen was the son of Democratic Congressman Rees Bowen, nephew of Senator John Warfield Johnston (a postwar member of the Conservative Party of Virginia, and cousin of Tennessee's last Whig governor William Bowen Campbell. After a private education suitable to his class, he attended Emory and Henry College in Emory, Virginia.

Confederate captain
Bowen farmed, then entered the Confederate Army in 1861 as a captain of the 22nd Virginia Cavalry, which fought with Payne's brigade, Lee's division, Army of Northern Virginia. On December 21, 1864, Sheridan's cavalry captured Capt. Bowen at Lacy Springs, Virginia. Upon being paroled on June 19, 1865, Bowen returned to his native county and resumed farming.

Political career 
Bowen was elected and re-elected as a one of Tazewell County's representatives in the Virginia House of Delegates from 1869 to 1873. In 1883, he was elected as a Readjuster to the Forty-eighth Congress, serving from March 4, 1883 to March 3, 1885. Bowen failed to win renomination in 1884. He was elected as a Republican to the Fiftieth Congress, serving from March 4, 1887 to March 3, 1889. He was an unsuccessful candidate for reelection in 1888 to the Fifty-first Congress.

In 1892, he was a delegate to the Republican National Convention. He returned to his farm and raised livestock in Tazewell County, Virginia.

Death and legacy 
Bowen died at his home, "Maiden Spring", in Tazewell County, April 29, 1915, and was buried in Jeffersonville Cemetery, Tazewell, Virginia.

References 

1841 births
1915 deaths
Emory and Henry College alumni
Republican Party members of the Virginia House of Delegates
Virginia lawyers
Readjuster Party politicians
Readjuster Party members of the United States House of Representatives
Republican Party members of the United States House of Representatives from Virginia
People from Tazewell County, Virginia
19th-century American politicians
19th-century American lawyers